Shelkanovo (Şalqan) is a rural locality (a village) in Malinovsky Selsoviet, Belebeyevsky District, Bashkortostan, Russia. The population was 11 as of 2010. There are 2 streets.

Geography 
Shelkanovo is located 19 km south of Belebey (the district's administrative centre) by road. Maly Meneuz is the nearest rural locality.

References 

Rural localities in Belebeyevsky District